Li Shuai (born 19 May 1994) is a Chinese professional footballer currently playing as a midfielder for Chinese Super League club Meizhou Hakka.

Club career
Li Shuai would play for the Shaanxi Renhe youth team before being loaned out to third tier football club Shaanxi Laochenggen. On his return he would be scouted by Portuguese football club Porto and was loaned out to their youth team. On his return from Portugal, Li Shuai was promoted to the senior team of Shaanxi Renhe (now renamed Guizhou Renhe), however he was unable to establish himself and he was loaned to third tier club Yinchuan Helanshan.

Li Shuai would join second tier football club Inner Mongolia Zhongyou during the 2015 China League One campaign on loan. On 14 March 2017 Li Shuai was allowed to leave on a free and joined third tier football club Heilongjiang Ice City. In his first season with the club he would quickly establish himself as a vital member of their team and go on to aid the club to the division title and promotion to the second tier.

On 22 March 2022, Li transferred to Chinese Super League club Meizhou Hakka. He would go on to make his debut in a league game on 4 June 2022 against Tianjin Jinmen Tiger in a 1-1 draw.

Career statistics
.

Honours

Club
Heilongjiang Ice City
China League Two: 2017

Individual
China League Two Most valuable player: 2017

References

External links

1994 births
Living people
People from Guiyang
Footballers from Guizhou
Chinese footballers
Chinese expatriate footballers
Association football midfielders
China League Two players
China League One players
Chinese Super League players
Beijing Renhe F.C. players
FC Porto players
Inner Mongolia Zhongyou F.C. players
Heilongjiang Ice City F.C. players
Meizhou Hakka F.C. players
Chinese expatriate sportspeople in Portugal
Expatriate footballers in Portugal
21st-century Chinese people